Héctor Abad Gómez (1921 – August 25, 1987) was a Colombian medical doctor, university professor, and human rights leader who founded the Colombian National School of Public Health. He developed practical public health programs for the poor in Medellín.

Abad is known for saying "the murderers don't know how to do: to use words to express the truth – a truth that will last longer than their lie."

El olvido que seremos (2006; t. Oblivion: A Memoir)
"Oblivion: A Memoir" by Héctor Abad Faciolince, is a memoir written about the author's father, Hector Abad Gomez. It discusses the life and the circumstances of Gomez's murder by paramilitaries. Ashley McNelis from the Bomb Magazine, describes the book as "...an honest and thorough reflection on a man's life from his son's perspective that also considers the private sphere of the family and the political turbulence in Colombia in the 1980s."

Literary works
 Manual de tolerancia (1988)

See also
 Forgotten We'll Be

References

1921 births
1987 deaths
Colombian public health doctors
Colombian male writers
Colombian human rights activists
Colombian educators
Colombian journalists
Male journalists
20th-century journalists